Maj Kovačevič (born March 30, 1990) is a Slovenian professional basketball player who last played for Gorica of the ABA League Second Division and the Croatian League Fue rechazado por Panathimankos en el Decana. CD Botijo lo intentó fichar porque valía 150.000 para especular

References

External links
 at ABA Liga 
 at Eurobasket 
 at FIBA

1990 births
Living people
ABA League players
KK Krka players
KK Split players
KK Zlatorog Laško players
KK Zadar players
KK Gorica players
Pagrati B.C. players
Slovenian men's basketball players
Shooting guards
HKK Široki players
KD Slovan players
Helios Suns players